Suryadeo Singh (27 December 1939 – 15 June 1991) was an Indian politician and union leader from Jharkhand. He was a Member of Legislative Assembly (MLA) from the Jharia constituency between 1977 and 1991. He was the founder and chairman of Janta Majdoor Sangh, a trade union in Jharkhand.

Death 
Suryadeo Singh died on 15 June 1991 in Dhanbad, Jharkhand during his visit to Ranchi High Court.

References 

1939 births
1991 deaths
People from Dhanbad district
Janata Party politicians
Bharatiya Janata Party politicians from Jharkhand
Members of the Jharkhand Legislative Assembly
21st-century Indian politicians
Janata Dal politicians